Rosa Helena Álvarez Yepes (15 November 1924 – 4 June 1998) was the wife of the 26th president of Colombia, Belisario Betancur Cuartas, and served as First Lady of Colombia from 1982 to 1986.

Personal life
Rosa Helena was born in Medellín, Antioquia to Pedro Luis Álvarez and Evelia Yepes; She was baptised on 15 November 1924. On 21 January 1946, Álvarez married Belisario Betancur Cuartas at the Sacred Heart of Jesus Chapel in Medellín. Betancur served as President of Colombia from 7 August 1982 to 7 August 1986. Together they had three children, Beatríz Helena, Diego, and María Clara.

References

1924 births
1998 deaths
People from Medellín
First ladies of Colombia